Money Creek Township may refer to the following townships in the United States:

 Money Creek Township, Houston County, Minnesota
 Money Creek Township, McLean County, Illinois